The Osterburg is a castle located conspicuously on a hill in the middle of the town of Weida in the county of Greiz in the German state of Thuringia.

Description 
Its 54-metre-high bergfried is the third highest and one of the oldest surviving bergfrieds in Germany. Above its second array of battlements there is a watchman's parlour, which accommodated a watchman until 1917. On the terrace there is a monument which records that this was the furthest south that the ice sheet came in Germany during the Elster glaciation.

Gallery

Sources 
 Henriette Joseph, Haik Thomas Porada (eds.): Das nördliche Vogtland um Greiz. (Landschaften in Deutschland Werte der deutschen Heimat, Vol. 68). Böhlau, Cologne etc., 2006, .
 Rosemarie Bimek, Heinz Fischer, Roland Gehring, Dr. Egbert Richter, Kurt Häßner, Dieter Hauer, Günter Kummer: 800 Jahre Osterburg, Weida in Thüringen. Stadtverwaltung Weida in Thüringen, Heimatmuseum Osterburg, Altenburg, 1993, pp. 1–52.

External links 

 The Osterburg at Weida (Weida town website)
 Friends of the Osterburg Weida
 Initiative to save the tower spire
 Newspaper article about renovation work at the Osterburg, OTZ, 24 May 2011

Buildings and structures completed in 1193
Castles in Thuringia
Museums in Thuringia
Greiz (district)